The Coronation Chair of Denmark (Danish and ; also:) is the chair formerly used in the coronation of the Danish monarch.

According to legend, the Coronation Chair is made of the horn of unicorns. In reality, it is made from Norwegian narwhal tusks. It is guarded by three life-size silver lions, based on Biblical references, and was a symbol of the absolute monarchy of the Twin Kingdoms.

The Coronation Chair is located in the Castle of Rosenborg in Copenhagen.

History 

Following the 1660 introduction of absolute monarchy in Denmark and Norway, King Frederick III (r. 1648–1670) ordered a coronation chair to be created. The Coronation Chair was made between 1662 and 1671 by Bendix Grodtschilling. During the reign of King Christian V (r. 1670–1699), gilt figures were added to the chair.

Both the Coronation Chair and the silver lions were inspired by the Biblical throne of Solomon, which was guarded by fourteen lions, as described in I Kings 10:

The Coronation Chair was used at coronations between 1671, for Christian V, and 1840. When absolute monarchy was replaced by constitutional monarchy in 1849, kings were no longer crowned or anointed, whereupon the Coronation Chair lost its practical function.

Lions 

The Coronation Chair is guarded by three lions of silver. They are the same size as natural lions, and each weighs 130 kilos. Their eyes, manes, and rumps are covered with pure gold. They were made between 1665 and 1670 by Ferdinand Kübich.

The silver lions are still used outside Rosenborg, mainly when protecting the castrum doloris of kings.

In art
On 20 November 1905, when delegates of the Norwegian parliament entered the Christian VII Palace in Copenhagen in order to offer the throne of Norway to Prince Carl, they were met—and stopped—by the lions. This moment was immortalized by photographer Peter Elfelt. Based on Elfelt's photograph, painter Paul Fischer made a famous painting. Several versions of this painting have existed, and one is included in the art collections in the Castle of Oslo.

The three silver lions are seen in one of Bjørn Nørgaard's chronological tapestries ("Early Absolutism") in Christiansborg Palace. They are also seen in Michael Melbyes's portrait of Margrethe II in Christiansborg Palace.

Gallery

See also 
 Thrones of Norway
 Monarchy of Denmark
 Monarchy of Norway

References

Sources 

 

Individual thrones
Danish monarchy
Norwegian monarchy